Crazy like a Fox is a 2004 comedy-drama film about a man who is evicted from his eighth-generation family home and farm in Virginia and fights to win it back. The film stars Roger Rees and Mary McDonnell and was directed by Richard Squires. It was shown at the Savannah Film and Video Festival in the United States on October 25, 2004 and played in three New York City theaters and a movie theater in Sterling, VA from May 5, 2006 to May 18, 2006. It was also released on DVD in 2006 through its production company, the Delphi Film Foundation. The character of "Nat Banks" was inspired by Nat Morison who maintained a gentlemanly character and resided on his family estate, Welbourne (Middleburg, Virginia).

Cast

References

External links
 
 

2004 films
American independent films
American comedy-drama films
2004 comedy-drama films
2004 independent films
2000s English-language films
2000s American films